Canada is scheduled to compete at the 2022 World Championships in Athletics in Eugene, Oregon, United States, from July 15−24, 2022.

The Canadian team of 54 athletes (24 men and 30 women) was named on June 30, 2022.  In July, five more athletes were named to the team (Cameron Proceviat, Catherine Léger, Gracelyn Larkin, Grace Fetherstonhaugh and Anicka Newell) after invitations from World Athletics. This meant the final team size was 59 athletes (25 men and 34 women).

Canada finished the event with four medals (one gold, two silver and one bronze), including a new national record and gold medal win in the 4x100 relay for men, 25 years after the last major win for the team at the 1996 Summer Olympics in Atlanta. The Canadian team also finished tied for overall in the placement table, with a total of 63 points, bettering its performance from 2019 (55 points and ninth overall).

Medallists

Results

Men
Malachi Murray and Benjamin Williams did not compete (both were named to the 4x100 relay team).
Track and road events

Field events

Combined events – Decathlon

Women
Sade McCreath and Makenzy Pierre-Webster did not compete.
Track and road events

Ran in heat only

Field events

See also
Canada at the 2022 World Aquatics Championships
Canada at the 2022 Commonwealth Games

References

Nations at the 2022 World Athletics Championships
World Championships in Athletics
2022